ConnectiCon is an annual multi-genre convention dedicated to "a celebration of pop culture - everything from anime, to science fiction, comic books and card games."

Events
The convention includes 24-hour screening rooms of full-length features and episodes of classic and modern science fiction and anime titles and sponsorship by GameStop, which also provides consoles for tournament and casual video gaming.

Gaming, including board, card, miniature and role-playing are featured. The convention also features an "artist alley" an art show, an exhibitor hall, panels and workshops throughout the convention as well as larger events on a theatrical level such the Masquerade, Cosplay Chess, Death Match, Dating Game, and Nerd Prom. Other entertainment includes artistic, musical and theatrical guest performances such as from Super Art Fight!.

Past guests
Past guests of honor have included popular North American voice actors for anime and video games such as Carlos Ferro and noted science fiction film and television actors such as Robert Picardo, Ethan Phillips, Ellen Muth, Glenn Shadix, and Peter Mayhew; and prominent web comic personalities such as Brian Clevinger (8-Bit Theater), Scott Ramsoomair (VG Cats), Tim Buckley (Ctrl+Alt+Del), and Ananth Hirsh and Mohammad "Hawk" Haque (Applegeeks). The convention has been held in the Connecticut Convention Center in Hartford since 2005, after having been held at the University of Hartford from its inception in 2003. The convention has grown in size every year since, with over 12,000 paid attendees as of 2016.

2018
Guests in 2018 included Cal Dodd, Troy Baker, Linda Ballantyne, Steve Blum, Jason Fry, Katie Griffin, Deedee Magno Hall, Vanessa Marshall, Nolan North, Ron Rubin, and Jon St. John.

References

External links
 Official website

Connecticut culture
Multigenre conventions
Recurring events established in 2003
Tourist attractions in Hartford, Connecticut
Conventions in Connecticut